The South Atlantic Gyre is the subtropical gyre in the south Atlantic Ocean. In the southern portion of the gyre, northwesterly (or southeastward-flowing) winds drive eastward-flowing currents that are difficult to distinguish from the northern boundary of the Antarctic Circumpolar Current. Like other oceanic gyres, it collects vast amounts of floating debris as a garbage patch.

Southern boundary 

South of this gyre is the Antarctic Circumpolar Current. This current flows from West to East around Antarctica. Another name for this current is the West Wind Drift. This current allows Antarctica to maintain its huge ice sheet by keeping warm ocean waters away. At approximately 125 Sv, this current is the largest ocean current.

Western boundary 

The Brazil Current is the western boundary current of the gyre.  It flows south along the Brazilian coast to the Rio de la Plata.  The current is considerably weaker than its North Atlantic counterpart, the Gulf Stream.

See also 
 Ocean current
 Ocean gyre
 Volta do mar

References

External links 
 Ocean currents (rsmas.miami.edu)
 Ocean currents (nasa.gov)

Currents of the Atlantic Ocean
Oceanic gyres